Geistthal-Södingberg is, since the beginning of 2015, a municipality within Voitsberg, Styria. The municipality of Geistthal-Södingberg was created as part of the Steiermärkische Gemeindestrukturreform (Styrian Area Structure Reform) in Styria, which combined Geistthal and Södingberg.

Geography

Communities 
The municipal area includes the following five localities (population from January 2015 in parentheses):

 Eggartsberg (297)
 Geistthal (262)
 Kleinalpe (109)
 Södingberg (816)
 Sonnleiten (133)

The district has an area of 52.59 km² and comprises the four Cadastral communities of Eggartsberg, Geistthal, Kleinalpe Södingberg and Sonnleiten.

Historical landmarks

Literature 
 Ernst Lasnik: Södingberg. Porträt einer Landschaft. Södingberg 2009

External links

References 

Cities and towns in Voitsberg District